Drive to the City is a single from British band Go:Audio. It is the third single taken from their debut album Made Up Stories. The official music video was released by Go:Audio onto their official YouTube channel on 18 March 2009. The single was released on 20 April 2009. It failed to make the UK top 40, peaking at #90 on the chart.

Track listing

CD Single
 Drive To The City
 Why (Piano Version)

CD Single Special Edition
 Drive To The City
 Brake! Brake! (Live)
 All Because Of You (Demo)

iTunes Version
 Drive To The City
 Drive To The City (Dance Mix)

References

2009 singles
2009 songs